Dex or DEX may refer to:

People
 Barbara Dex, Belgian singer
 Dex Elmont, Dutch judoka
 Dex Lee, English actor
 Dex Manley, American actor
 Famous Dex, Chicago rapper

Reference
 Dex, the official directory of Qwest Communications International, a former US telecom provider
 Dicționarul explicativ al limbii române (DEX), The Explanatory Dictionary of the Romanian Language

Art, entertainment, and media

Fictional entities
 Dex, in the film Star Wars: Episode II – Attack of the Clones
 Dex, in the film The Tao of Steve
 Ronon Dex, from the TV series Stargate Atlantis
 Dex Dexter, from the TV series Dynasty

Games
 Dex (video game)
Dex, an abbreviation for the dexterity attribute in role playing games
 Battle Dex, an online, turn-based strategy game featuring collectible cards inspired by Advance Wars and Magic: The Gathering
Pokédex, the collection of the fictional animals called "Pokémon"

Literature
 Dex, a fictional teen novel series Keeper of the Lost Cities by Shannon Messenger

Music
Dex, a vocal from the Vocaloid software

Television
 Dex Hamilton: Alien Entomologist, an Australian children's TV program
 "Dex" (Dynasty), an episode of the TV series Dynasty

Mathematics and science
 DEX (Graph database), a graph database
 Contraction of decimal exponent, for use with values on a logarithmic scale
 Especially  in astronomy
 Dexamethasone, a potent synthetic member of the glucocorticoid class of steroid hormones
 Dextroamphetamine, a psychostimulant drug
 Dexmedetomidine, a sedative medication frequently used in the ICU
 Dextromethorphan, an antitussive drug
 Dextrorotation, the property of clockwise-rotating plane polarized light
 Enantiomer or dextrorotary stereoisomer, in chemistry

Brands and enterprises
 Dex Media
 DEX One, subsidiary of Dex Media
 Dex Media (Dex One), former subsidiary of DEX One
 DEX New York, American cosmetics company
 Dex-Cool, antifreeze
 Subaru Dex

Computing and technology
 DEX (protocol), a data-collection method for vending machines
 .dex, standard extension for a Dalvik Executable File, into which programs for the Android OS are compiled
 DEX (Decision EXpert), a qualitative multi-criteria decision analysis (MCDA) method
 Samsung DeX, a dock for smartphones, allowing desktop-like functionality
 Decentralized exchange (DEX), a cryptocurrency exchange without a central authority allowing peer-to-peer trading of cryptocurrencies

See also
 Dexter (disambiguation)